Marcus Söderlund  is a Swedish music video, commercial and documentary director. He has directed music videos for several Swedish artists such as Yung Lean, The Tough Alliance, jj, Fibes, Oh Fibes!, Jens Lekman and Miike Snow, and has worked with international artists such as The xx, Lissie, Mura Masa and Mount Kimbie.

Aside from directing music videos, Söderlund has directed some documentaries, including one about Fibes, Oh Fibes!, and one about the football player Håkan Mild. He has also directed commercials for McLaren, Reebok, Lloyds Banking Group, BBC, Vodafone and Avis  among others.

The music video for The Tough Alliance's song "Silly Crimes", which Marcus Söderlund directed, was featured on Pitchfork's list of The Top 50 Music Videos of the 2000s. Marcus Söderlund has regularly been featured in Campaign Magazine's Annual as one of the top directors in the industry.

Videography
2006

Marit Bergman - "Eyes Were Blue"				          				
Koop - "Come To Me"
Fibes, Oh Fibes! - "Get Up"
The Tough Alliance - "Silly Crimes"
The Embassy - "Stage Persona"

2007
Jens Lekman - "Sipping On The Sweet Nectar"
The Tough Alliance - "A New Chance"
The Honeydrips - "I Wouldn't Know What To Do"
Vapnet - "Tar Tillbaka Det"
Kalle J - "Vingslag"
The Tough Alliance - "First Class Riot"
Koop - "I See A Different You"

2008
Sahara Hotnights - "In Private"
First Floor Power - "The Jacket"
Bengt Svan - "Gubbpepp"
Nordpolen - "Skimret"
The Tough Alliance - "Neo Violence"
Joel Alme - "The Queen's Corner"
Jonas Game - "Nothing To Lose"

2009
Miike Snow - "Silvia"
jj - "Baby"
Taken by Trees - "My Boys"
Jenny Wilson - "Like A Fading Rainbow"
Fibes, Oh Fibes! - "Love Child"
Avner - "Bed för mig"
Marit Bergman - "Bang Bang"
Air France - "No Excuses"

2010
Lissie - "Everywhere I Go"
ceo - "Come With Me"
jj - "Let Go"
The xx - "VCR"

2011
Jessie Ware & Sampha - "Valentine"
Architecture in Helsinki - "Escapee"

2012
Loreen - "Euphoria"
Jens Lekman  - "Become Someone Else's"
Jens Lekman - "I Know What Love Isn't"  
Jens Lekman - "Erica America"  
2013
John Olav Nilsen & Gjengen - "Bensinbarn"
Mount Kimbie & King Krule - "You Took Your Time"
2014
John Martin - "Anywhere for you"
1987 - "Michelle"
Yung Lean - "Yoshi City"
Lorentz feat. Jaqe, Duvchi, jj, Joy - "Där dit vinden kommer"
2015
Yung Lean & Thaiboy Digital - "Diamonds"
2016
Yung Lean - "Miami Ultras"
2017
Yung Lean - "Red Bottom Sky"
2018
Yung Lean - "Happy Feet"
2019
Sarah Klang - "It's Been Heaven Knowing You"
Palmistry - "Water"
2020
Lorentz feat. Duvchi - "Intro"
Mura Masa, Ellie Rowsell, Wolf Alice - "Teenage Headache Dreams"
Abidaz feat. Yung Lean - "Evigheten"
Yung Lean - Violence + Pikachu

References

External links

Swedish film directors
Swedish music video directors
Living people
Year of birth missing (living people)